The Roar of P4 is a live album from ProjeKct Four, a King Crimson offshoot band. It was recorded on November 1, 1998 in the U.S. city of San Francisco, California and released by the King Crimson Collector's Club in August 1999.

Track listing
 "Ghost" (Robert Fripp, Trey Gunn, Tony Levin, Pat Mastelotto) – 8:50
 "Heavy ContruKction" (Adrian Belew, Fripp, Gunn) – 9:14
 "Light ConstruKction" (Belew, Fripp, Gunn) – 8:32
 "Deception of the Thrush" (Belew, Fripp, Gunn) – 9:04
 "Seizure" (Fripp, Gunn, Levin, Mastelotto) – 13:36
 "Ghost 3" (Fripp, Gunn, Levin, Mastelotto) – 12:13
 "ProjeKction" (Fripp, Gunn, Levin, Mastelotto) – 10:12

Personnel
Robert Fripp – guitar
Tony Levin – basses, Didgeridoo
Trey Gunn – touch guitar, talker
Pat Mastelotto – electronic traps and buttons

References

1999 live albums
King Crimson Collector's Club albums